Zou Xufeng is a Chinese wheelchair fencer. She represented China at the 2016 Summer Paralympics and she won two medals: the gold medal in the women's épée A event and the gold medal in the women's team épée event.

References

External links 
 

Living people
Year of birth missing (living people)
Place of birth missing (living people)
Chinese female fencers
Wheelchair fencers at the 2016 Summer Paralympics
Medalists at the 2016 Summer Paralympics
Paralympic gold medalists for China
Paralympic medalists in wheelchair fencing
Paralympic wheelchair fencers of China
21st-century Chinese women